Lock and Dam No. 15 is a lock and dam located on the Upper Mississippi River. It spans the river between Rock Island, Illinois and Davenport, Iowa. It is unusual among the upper Mississippi River dams in that it has only roller gates, has different sizes and types of roller gates, it is not perpendicular to the flow of the river and is one of the few facilities that has a completed auxiliary lock. In 2004, the facility was listed in the National Register of Historic Places as Lock and Dam No. 15 Historic District, #04000175 covering , 2 buildings, 9 structures, and 1 object.

See also
 Government Bridge, passes near the locks.
 Rock Island Arsenal adjacent to the locks.

References

External links

Mississippi River Visitor Center Locks & Dam 15 - U.S. Army Corps of Engineers
Lock and Dam No. 15 - U.S. Army Corps of Engineers

US Army Corps of Engineers LD 15 Cam 2 – Live camera of Lock & Dam 15, picture updated every 60 seconds

Transport infrastructure completed in 1895
Dams in Illinois
Dams in Iowa
Mississippi River locks
Buildings and structures in Rock Island, Illinois
Buildings and structures in Davenport, Iowa
15
15
15
Tourist attractions in the Quad Cities
National Register of Historic Places in Rock Island County, Illinois
Tourist attractions in Rock Island County, Illinois
Transportation buildings and structures in Rock Island County, Illinois
Transportation in Davenport, Iowa
Tourist attractions in Davenport, Iowa
United States Army Corps of Engineers dams
Historic American Engineering Record in Iowa
Historic American Engineering Record in Illinois
Roller dams
Dams on the Mississippi River
Mississippi Valley Division
Historic districts on the National Register of Historic Places in Illinois
15